Let the Fire Burn is a 2013 documentary film by Jason Osder.

Let the Fire Burn may also refer to:

Let the Fire Burn, a 2001 album by Ha'Saruf
Let the Fire Burn, a 2012 album by the band Art of Dying (band)
"Let the Fire Burn", a song by Sister Hazel from 2010 album Heartland Highway